Johan Stureson (born 3 August 1973 in Kristianstad) is a Swedish auto racing driver currently racing in Scandinavian Touring Car Championship for IPS Team Biogas in a Volkswagen Scirocco. He is son of the former driver and 1985 DTM champion Per Stureson.

Racing career 
Stureson began his career in Formula BMW Junior in 1992. He is Swedish GT champion for 2002 and he moved to the Swedish Touring Car Championship in 2003. He raced in 2005 with Peugeot 407 and with Peugeot 308 in 2008. For 2010 season he switched to BMW 320si, after racing with Peugeot since 2004. For the 2012 Scandinavian Touring Car Championship season he will race Volkswagen Scirocco again for his family-run team IPS.

Racing record

Complete German Formula 3 results
(key) (Races in bold indicate pole position) (Races in italics indicate fastest lap)

Complete Swedish GTR Championship results
(key) (Races in bold indicate pole position) (Races in italics indicate fastest lap)

Complete European Touring Car Championship results
(key) (Races in bold indicate pole position) (Races in italics indicate fastest lap)

References

External links

1973 births
Living people
Swedish racing drivers
European Touring Car Championship drivers
European Touring Car Cup drivers
People from Kristianstad Municipality
Sportspeople from Skåne County